The men's 400 metre freestyle S7 event at the 2012 Paralympic Games took place on 6 September, at the London Aquatics Centre in the Olympic Park, London. The event was for athletes included in the S7 classification, which is for competitors with physical impairments. Sixteen swimmers took part, representing a total of thirteen different nations. Great Britain's Josef Craig set a new world records in both the heats and the final as he won the gold medal.

Competition

Heats
Two heats were held, each with eight swimmers; the swimmers with the eight fastest times advanced to the final. The heats took place on 6 September starting at 9:51 BST.

British swimmer Josef Craig won the first heat while setting a new world record time of four minutes, 45.79 seconds. Shiyun Pan of China finished third in the heat but set a new Asian record time Croatian Mihovil Spanja and Australian Matthew Levy also qualified for the final from heat one.

The second heat was won by Jonathan Fox of Great Britain in a time of four minutes, 49.91 seconds. Fox qualified from the heats as the second fastest swimmer overall and was joined in the final by Andrey Gladkov of Russia, Marian Kvasnytsia of Ukraine and Lantz Lamback of the United States, who finished second, third and fourth in the second heat.

Final
The final of the event took place on 6 September at 17:47 BST. Great Britain's Craig won the gold medal in a time of four minutes, 42.81 seconds, breaking his own world record that he had set in heats earlier in the day. At the age of 15 Craig was the youngest gold medallist for the hosts Great Britain at the 2012 Games. The silver medal went to Pan of China as he beat his own Asian record time from the heats. Bronze was won by 15-year-old Russian Gladkov.

Results
Key
 Qualified for next round
AS = Asian record
WR = World record

Heats

Heat 1

Heat 2

Final

References

Swimming at the 2012 Summer Paralympics